John Berry (May 31, 1963 – May 19, 2016) was an American hardcore punk musician. He was a founding member of the Beastie Boys, although he left the band in 1982 before they secured any commercial success.

Berry is credited with conceiving the band's name, Beastie Boys, when the members were teenagers.

Biography
Berry was born on May 31, 1963; his father was John N. Berry, a librarian and journal editor. He attended the Walden School in Manhattan. It was there where he met Michael Diamond and the two were founding members of the Young Aborigines, later known as the Beastie Boys. The two other founding members are Adam Yauch and Kate Schellenbach.

The Beastie Boys were initially a hardcore punk band. Formed at a time where the New York punk scene was witnessing a shift, and Berry was an important part of that transition. Berry played guitar on the band's first release, a seven-inch EP, Polly Wog Stew. He was the first to leave the band, later followed by Schellenbach.

Their first shows were at Berry’s loft on West 100th Street and Broadway on the Upper West Side.

He died May 19, 2016, at a hospice in Danvers, Massachusetts, of frontotemporal dementia.

References

1963 births
2016 deaths
20th-century American guitarists
American punk rock musicians
Beastie Boys members
Deaths from dementia in Massachusetts
Deaths from frontotemporal dementia
Guitarists from New York City
People from the Upper West Side
Singers from New York City
Walden School (New York City) alumni